Rugby union in Vietnam is a minor but growing sport, with the national team managed by Yale graduate Thao Do.

Governing body

History
Rugby was originally introduced when Vietnam was part of French Indochina, but this was mainly by French expatriates. After independence there was a long hiatus, as financial and political forces, from famine to the Vietnam War meant it was impossible for the game to be played.

The Indochinese Cup was established in 1999, as a four sided tourname between Vietnamese teams from Saïgon and Hanoi, Vientiane (Laos) and Phnom Penh in Cambodia.

The historical connection with France is a mixed blessing. A number of people who could qualify for Vietnam's national team play in France. An example is the MHRC played François Trinh-Duc, who has a Vietnamese grandfather.

See also
 Vietnam national rugby union team

References

External links
 Rugby in Asia, Vietnam page

 
Sport in Vietnam